The Prince of Liechtenstein Foundation is a portfolio of private companies, museums, and art collections owned by the Princely Family of Liechtenstein. It is essentially a cap for a multitude of investments, such as the LGT Group, the Hofkellerei wineries, Wilfersdorf Agricultural and Forest Company, RiceTec, and real estate holdings in Vienna, Austria. As of 2012, there were 15 companies and 2 museums owned by the Foundation.

In late 2009, rumors speculated that the foundation was attempting to purchase rights to Vaduz FC. However, this has never been confirmed or denied, as of late 2012. The Foundation also plays national heritage and political roles, opening up a Liechtenstein culture museum, selling the political books that support the princely family, and funding right-leaning politicians.

Overview 
The foundation is a Vaduz-based establishment, created in 1970, to manage assets of the Princely Portfolio. Prince Hans-Adam II was head of the foundation from 1970 through 1984, until his brother Prince Philipp Erasmus succeeded him as CEO, Prince Philipp was also the CEO for LGT Group, before being replaced by his nephew Prince Maximilian in 2006. Before becoming CEO, Prince Philipp was a well-known hedge fund investor, working at the head of many influential investment firms. However, Prince Hans-Adam II is still the main beneficiary of the foundation at the present time.

The chairman of Pearson PLC, Glen Moreno, is on the board of trustees at the foundation and also LGT Group. Cuno Pümpin is the chairman of the board of directors at Invision Private Equity AG; he is also a member of the board of trustees at the foundation and LGT Group.

List of companies 
Here is a list of all foundation companies; they are:
 Forestry Kalwang
 Hofkellerei Vaduz
 Hofkellerei Wilfersdorf
 LGT Group
 Liechtenstein Energie GmbH & Co KG
 LIECO GmbH & KG
 Palais Liechtenstein GmbH
 Real Estate Administration Vienna
 RiceTec
 Van Eck Publishers 
 Wilfersdorf Agricultural and Forest Company

Museums 
Here is a list of all Foundation museums, they are:

 Liechtenstein Royal Museum
 Liechtenstein Museum
 Liechtenstein Museum of Fine Arts (Art exhibit only)

References

External links 
 

1970 establishments in Liechtenstein
Economy of Liechtenstein
Foundations based in Liechtenstein